Karen May (born 1944) is a former Democratic member of the Illinois House of Representatives for the 58th District, serving from 2001 to 2012. The district includes parts of Bannockburn, Deerfield, Glencoe, Highland Park, Highwood, Lake Bluff, Lake Forest, Northbrook, and Riverwoods.

May received her Bachelor of Arts in Communication from the University of Illinois at Urbana-Champaign. She and her husband live in Highland Park where they brought up their two children. A Chicago Tribune article in 2010 cited May as the third most frequent flyer on state owned aircraft in the Illinois General Assembly. May's explanation for her use of state aviation was that driving is painful for her previously injured neck and back. The "controversial" nature of air travel, according to the same article, is that the Illinois Auditor General has determined that their cost to the taxpayers is higher than other forms of transportation.

As of 2019, May is a member of the Statewide Compliance Advisory Panel. The panel renders advisory opinions on the effectiveness of SBEAP and difficulties encountered by small businesses as required by Section 507 of the 1990 Clean Air Act.

References

External links
Illinois State Representative Karen May official website
Illinois General Assembly – Representative Karen May (D) 58th District official IL House website
Bills Committees
Project Vote Smart – Representative Karen May (IL) profile
Follow the Money – Karen May
2006 2004 2002 2000 campaign contributions
Illinois House Democrats – Karen May profile

1944 births
Living people
Democratic Party members of the Illinois House of Representatives
People from Highland Park, Illinois
Women state legislators in Illinois
21st-century American politicians
21st-century American women politicians